Bornholm is one of the 12 multi-member constituencies of the Folketing, the national legislature of Denmark. The constituency was established in 2007 following the public administration structural reform. It consists of the municipality of Bornholm and the unincorporated archipelago of Christiansø (Ertholmene). The constituency currently elects two of the 179 members of the Folketing using the open party-list proportional representation electoral system. At the 2022 general election it had 30,825 registered electors.

Electoral system
Bornholm currently elects two of the 179 members of the Folketing using the open party-list proportional representation electoral system. Constituency seats are allocated using the D'Hondt method. Compensatory seats are calculated based on the national vote and are allocated using the Sainte-Laguë method, initially at the provincial level and finally at the constituency level. Only parties that reach any one of three thresholds stipulated by section 77 of the Folketing (Parliamentary) Elections Act - winning at least one constituency seat; obtaining at least the Hare quota (valid votes in province/number of constituency seats in province) in two of the three provinces; or obtaining at least 2% of the national vote - compete for compensatory seats.

Election results

Summary

(Excludes compensatory seats)

Detailed

2022
Results of the 2022 general election held on 1 November 2022:

Votes per municipality:<

The following candidates were elected:
 Constituency seats - Peter Juel-Jensen (V), 4,493 votes; and Lea Wermelin (A), 3,580 votes.

2019
Results of the 2019 general election held on 5 June 2019:

Votes per municipality:

The following candidates were elected:
 Constituency seats - Peter Juel-Jensen (V), 5,962 votes; and Lea Wermelin (A), 7,441 votes.

2015
Results of the 2015 general election held on 18 June 2015:

Votes per municipality:

The following candidates were elected:
 Constituency seats - Peter Juel-Jensen (V), 4,735 votes; and Lea Wermelin (A), 5,599 votes.

2011
Results of the 2011 general election held on 15 September 2011:

Votes per municipality:

The following candidates were elected:
 Constituency seats - Peter Juel-Jensen (V), 6,516 votes; and Jeppe Kofod (A), 9,394 votes.

2007
Results of the 2007 general election held on 13 November 2007:

Votes per municipality:

The following candidates were elected:
 Constituency seats - Peter Juel-Jensen (V), 3,463 votes; and Jeppe Kofod (A), 8,990 votes.

References

Folketing constituency
Folketing constituencies
Folketing constituencies established in 2007